The 2007 season of the Belgian Football League (BFL) is the regular season played in the Belgium. The West Flanders Tribes won Belgian Bowl XX against the Brussels Black Angels by a score of 35-13. This was their second consecutive win of the Belgian Bowl.

Regular season

Regular season standings
W = Wins, L = Losses, T = Ties, PCT = Winning Percentage, PF= Points For, PA = Points Against

 - clinched seed to the playoffs

Post season

References

American football in Belgium
BFL
BFL